Manfred Merkel (born 3 November 1938) is a retired slalom canoeist who competed for East Germany.

Merkel was born in 1938 in Meuselwitz. He competed from the late 1950s to the late 1960s. He won seven gold medals at the ICF Canoe Slalom World Championships (C-2: 1961, 1963, 1965; C-2 team: 1961, 1963, 1967; Mixed C-2: 1959).

See also
Günther Merkel

References

1938 births
German male canoeists
Living people
Medalists at the ICF Canoe Slalom World Championships
People from Meuselwitz
Sportspeople from Thuringia